Beliatta is a town located in the Hambantota District of Sri Lanka.

Geography 
It is an inland town, approximately,  from the coastal town of Tangalle. Beliatta has the second highest mountain range located in the Beliatta Divisional Secretariat area (also called Raga) on the boundary of Hambantota and Matara districts. Beliatta is fed by fountain water originating from Rilagala mountain range. 

Apart from Tangalle, the nearest major towns from Beliatta are Ambalantota, Walasmulla and Matara.

Demographics 
The population of Beliatta is almost entirely Sinhalese (more than 99%), while the rest are Tamils. 

Buddhism and Christianity are the main religions. Beliatta Siri Sunanda Maha Viharaya is the main Buddhist temple.

Economy 
Beliatta is known for the production of coconuts, paddy, pepper and cinnamon.

Education 

The main educational institutions in Beliatta include Beliatta Central College, Dammapala Girls' School, Beliatta Technical college and Pagngnananda Primary School. 

Beliatta Central College is the largest and best known school in Beliatta. In 1994, the college was converted from a mixed-gender school to a boys-only school. However in 2014, the decision was reversed and the college was re-established as a mixed-gender school.
 
The school was initially established as a mixed-gender school but was later changed to a girls-only school.

Beliatta Technical college is a tertiary institution and was one of the pioneers of the Technical College concept in Beliatta. The technical college is located on Tangalle road about 0.5 km from Beliatta town. It offers various courses and has a large number of students graduating each year.

Transport 

The Beliatta railway station, which opened on 8 April 2019, serves as the current southernmost terminus of the Coastal Line.

See also 

 Railway stations in Sri Lanka

References

External links 
 Branch/ ATM Locator

Populated places in Hambantota District
 Grama Niladhari divisions of Sri Lanka